Ballet Boys (Ballettguttene / Dancers / 芭蕾夢 / Ballettstrakar / バレエ・ボーイズ /  Balettipojat / Балетные Мальчики / Balettpojkarna / Οι μπαλαρίνοι ) is a 2014 Norwegian documentary directed by Kenneth Elvebakk and produced by Indie Film in Oslo. The film is available in both for cinema (75 min) and television (59 min.).

Lukas Bjørneboe Brændsrød, Syvert Lorenz Garcia and Torgeir Lund are experiencing important first years of their ballet careers. They have to deal with pressure from parents and teachers as well as facing challenges in their first international ballet competitions in France and Sweden. To secure their career, succeeding in the audition for the Norwegian Ballet Academy, is of most importance. Out of the blue, Lukas is invited to the final audition at the Royal Ballet School in London. This is his opportunity of a lifetime. During the course of four years we see the boys become young men, and friends separate.

The music in Ballet Boys is composed by Henrik Skram and performed by F.A.M.E.'S project, Macedonian Radio Symphonic Orchestra. The modern music is composed by Goran Obad. Ballet Boys is edited by Christoffer Heie, photographers are Torstein Nodland, Svend Even Hærra and Kenneth Elvebakk, sound mix by Bernt Syversen. The film poster is made by Daniel Barradas and photo by  Jörg Wiesner. Ballet Boys had its theatrichal release in England in September 2014. Wide House is the films sales agent worldwide.

Awards and nominations
 Winner of Best Youth Film (For Tomorrow award), Oulu International Children's and Youth Film Festival
 Winner of the Audience Award, Tromsø International Children's Film Festival
 Winner of Best Reportage, The International Festival of Films on Art in Montréal
 Winner of Best Original Music at the Norwegian TV Award "Gullruten" (Henrik Skram)
 Children's Jury 2nd Prize Documentary Feature Film, Chicago International Children's Film Festival
 Nominated for Best Original Score for a Documentary by the International Film Music Critics Association Award, IFMCA (Henrik Skram)
 Nominated for the Award SOS Kinderdörfer weltweit on DOK.fest in Munich
 Official Selection - DOC U Competition - IDFA 2014

External links

The Norwegian Film Institute / Ballet Boys
The Telegraph / Ballet Boys
Movie Wave / Ballet Boys Music

2014 films
2014 documentary films
Norwegian documentary films
Documentary films about ballet
Coming-of-age films based on actual events